The Hunter 36 Vision is an American sailboat designed for cruising and first built in 1990.

The design can be confused with the 1980 Hunter 36, 2008 Hunter 36-2 (sold as the Hunter 36) and the 2001 Hunter 36 Legend, all sailboats with similar names by the same builder.

Production
The design was built by Hunter Marine in the United States between 1990 and 1995, but it is now out of production.

Design
The Hunter 36 Vision is a recreational keelboat, built predominantly of fiberglass, with wood trim. It has a free-standing fractional sloop rig, with a fully battened mainsail, a raked stem, a reverse transom, an internally mounted spade-type rudder controlled by a wheel and a fixed wing keel. It displaces  and carries  of ballast.

The boat is fitted with a Japanese Yanmar diesel engine.

The design has a PHRF racing average handicap of 144 with a high of 150 and low of 135.

See also
List of sailing boat types

Related development
Hunter 32 Vision

Similar sailboats
Bayfield 40
Beneteau 361
C&C 36-1
C&C 36R
C&C 110
Catalina 36
Columbia 36
Coronado 35
Crealock 37
CS 36
Ericson 36
Frigate 36
Hunter 36
Hunter 36 Legend
Hunter 36-2
Invader 36
Islander 36
Nonsuch 36
Portman 36
S2 11.0
Seidelmann 37
Watkins 36
Watkins 36C

References

Keelboats
1990s sailboat type designs
Sailing yachts
Sailboat types built by Hunter Marine